Ekelundsbron (Swedish: "The Ekelund Bridge") is a bridge in Stockholm, Sweden.  Passing over the canal Karlbergskanalen, it connects the city district Stadshagen on Kungsholmen to the northern suburb Solna.

The bridge is named after the crofter's holding once found nearby called Ekelund or Eklundstorpet (ek = "oak", lund = "grove", torp = "cottage"), which also gave its name to the shanty town found here around 1880. The bridge was earlier called Karlbergsbron.

Historically, the bridge was a simple wooden bridge crossing a clogged canal. A  concrete bridge resting on concrete arches built in 1956 proved insufficient by 1969 and was thus replaced by a  bridge.

See also 
 List of bridges in Stockholm
 Sankt Eriksbron
 Barnhusbron
 Essingeleden

References 

Bridges in Stockholm